Nalwar  is a village in the southern state of Karnataka, India. It is in the Chitapur taluk of kalaburagi district.

Demographics
 India census, Nalwar had a population of 11,533 with 5910 males and 5623 females.

See also
 Districts of Karnataka
 Gulbarga

References

External links
 http://Gulbarga.nic.in/

Villages in Kalaburagi district